Rafiq Subaie (‎; 9 February 1930 – 5 January 2017) was a Syrian actor, writer and director. He appeared with Salah Zulfikar in A Memory of a Night of Love (1973).

Career
Subaie was born in one of the oldest districts of old Damascus and as an actor contributed to Syrian drama. He was well known for acting alongside Egyptian leading actor Salah Zulfikar in Memory of a Night of Love (1973). Subaie is also known by the name "Abu Sayyah", that of a character he played in plays and television series.

Selected filmography
1967 – "Makalib Ghawar", actor, comedy series
1973 – "Memory of a Night of Love", actor, Syrian film
2013 – "Amar el Sham", actor, Syrian drama

References

1930 births
2017 deaths
Syrian Muslims
Syrian male television actors
People from Damascus
20th-century Syrian male actors
21st-century Syrian male actors
Syrian screenwriters